Richard "Dick" Evans (born 26 January 1945) is an English-born former rugby league footballer who played in the 1970s.

Playing career
Born in St Helens, Lancashire, Evans started his rugby league career at Huyton. He was signed by Barrow in April 1969.

In December 1970, Evans was signed by Swinton for a fee of £5,000.

International honours
Although born in England, Evans was eligible to play for Wales due to his Welsh ancestry. He won caps for Wales while at Swinton in the 1975 Rugby League World Cup against France (2 matches).

References

External links
Wasteful Wales Get A Roasting
(archived by web.archive.org) Back on the Wembley trail

1945 births
Living people
Barrow Raiders players
English rugby league players
Rugby league hookers
Rugby league players from St Helens, Merseyside
Salford Red Devils players
Swinton Lions players
Wales national rugby league team players
Liverpool City (rugby league) players